Blueville is an unincorporated community in Taylor County, West Virginia, United States.

The community was named for the local Blue family.

References 

Unincorporated communities in West Virginia
Unincorporated communities in Taylor County, West Virginia